Amaya Eva Coppens Zamora (born 1994) is a Nicaraguan Belgian student activist. She is a leading figure of the April 19 University Movement, founded during protests against the government of President Daniel Ortega. She was chosen as an International Woman of Courage in March 2020.

Life
Coppens was born in Brussels in 1994. She was the daughter of Belgian sociologist Federico Coppens and Nicaraguan sociologist Tamara Zamora. Amaya Coppens lives and studies in Nicaragua. She completed the IB diploma at Li Po Chun United World College in Hong Kong. She studied medicine at the National Autonomous University of Nicaragua at León (UNAN-Leon).

She decides to join the protests against Daniel Ortega in 2018. She became one of the leaders of the April 19 University Movement.

She was accused of terrorism and aggravated robbery for having peacefully denounced the abuses of the regime. She was arrested twice, in April 2018 for having participated in demonstrations against the regime of the President, then in November 2019 for having brought aid to women who were supporting imprisoned opponents and who had started a hunger strike.

Recognition
The Spanish newspaper El País recognised Coppens as the most influential person in South America. At a time of turmoil she was "a moral and political benchmark".

She was chosen as an International Woman of Courage in March 2020 by the United States Secretary of State.

See also 

 Valeska Sandoval

References

1994 births
Living people
Activists from Brussels
Nicaraguan activists
Nicaraguan women activists
Recipients of the International Women of Courage Award
2018 Nicaraguan protests
Nicaraguan women
People educated at a United World College